Victoria Azarenka was the defending champion, but chose to compete at the BGL Luxembourg Open instead.

Dominika Cibulková won her first WTA tour title, defeating Kaia Kanepi in the final 3–6, 7–6(7–1), 7–5.

Seeds
The top four seeds receive a bye into the second round.

Qualifying

Main draw

Finals

Top half

Bottom half

References
 Main Draw

Kremlin Cup - Kremlin Cup - Women's Singles
2011 Women's Singles